760 Naval Air Squadron (760 NAS) is a Naval Air Squadron of the Royal Navy's Fleet Air Arm.
The squadron first formed on 1 April 1940 as No.1 Fleet Fighter Pool with a variety of aircraft types before standardising in 1941 on the Sea Hurricane. In this role it disbanded on 31 December 1942.
In May 1944 760 NAS briefly reformed as an Anti-Submarine Operational Training Squadron before disbanding into 766 Naval Air Squadron in November. Reformed again as part of No.1 Naval Air Fighter School in April 1945 it converted fighter pilots to the Corsair and then the Seafire until 23 January 1946 when it disbanded.

760 Squadron reformed in 1989 at the Air Engineering School Lee-on-Solent providing air engineering training for officers and ratings using old airframes. The school moved to  Gosport in 1995. It continues as the Engineering Training Squadron of the Royal Navy Air Engineering and Survival School, now equipped with retired Sea King airframes.

History of 760 NAS

Fighter Pool Squadron (1940 - 1942) 
760 Naval Air Squadron was formed at RNAS Eastleigh (HMS Raven), in Hampshire, on the 1 April 1940, as Fighter Pool No.1. It was initially equipped with four Skua, two Roc and one Sea Gladiator aircraft. Five months later, on the 16 September 1940, the squadron relocated to RNAS Yeovilton (HMS Heron) near Yeovil, Somerset. The squadron acquired Master, Fulmar, Martlet, Buffalo, Hurricane and Sea Hurricane aircraft, from 1940 to 1941. 760 NAS disbanded at Yeovilton on the 31 December 1942.

Anti-Submarine Operational Training Squadron (1944) 
760 Naval Air Squadron reformed at RNAS Inskip (HMS Nightjar), near the village of Inskip, Lancashire, on the 1 May 1944, as an Anti-Submarine Operational Training Squadron. The squadron was equipped solely with Sea Hurricane aircraft. However, this role only lasted for six months and 760 NAS disbanded at Inskip on the 1 November 1944.

Naval Air Fighter School (1945 - 1946) 
760 Naval Air Squadron reformed on the 10 April 1945 at RNAS Zeals (HMS Hummingbird), located north of the village of Zeals, in Wiltshire, as part of the Naval Air Fighter School. The squadron was initially equipped with Harvard and Corsair aircraft and in August 1945, also operated Hellcat. On the 12 September 1945, 760 NAS moved to RNAS Lee-on-Solent (HMS Daedalus), situated near Lee-on-the-Solent in Hampshire. Retaining only the Harvard, the squadron was equipped with Seafire aircraft from October 1945. The squadron moved again, on the 27 December 1945 it relocated to RNAS Henstridge (HMS Dipper), situated near Henstridge, in Somerset and continuing with Seafire aircraft. However, the move to Henstridge only lasted one month, with 760 NAS disbanding there on the 23 January 1946.

Engineering Training Squadron (1989 - ) 

760 Naval Air Squadron reformed at RNAS Lee-on-Solent (HMS Daedalus) in 1989, within the Air Engineering School and utilised Wessex airframes for training. Prior to RNAS Lee-on Solent closing, the squadron moved to HMS Sultan, in Gosport, Hampshire, in December 1995. It is currently the Engineering Training Squadron, within the Royal Naval Air Engineering & Survival School (RNAESS), equipped with Sea King airframes for training purposes.

Current role 
760 Engineering Training Squadron, is part of Royal Naval Air Engineering & Survival School (RNAESS), based at HMS Sultan, which is located at Gosport in Hampshire. The RNAESS forms part of the Defence School of Aeronautical Engineering, which provides training for aircraft engineering officers and tradesmen across the three British armed forces. The squadron is housed in the Stephenson Hangar at HMS Sultan, where its role is to train Air Engineering personnel in the supervision and administration of aircraft maintenance and line procedures.

Aircraft flown 

The squadron has flown a number of different aircraft types, including:

Blackburn Skua Mk.II (Apr 1940 - Apr 1941)
Blackburn Roc I (Apr 1940 - Mar 1941)
Gloster Sea Gladiator (Apr 1940 - Sep 1940)
Miles M.9B Master I (Jun 1940 - Dec 1942)
Fairey Fulmar Mk.I (Mar 1941 - Jun 1941)
Fairey Fulmar Mk.II (Mar 1941 - Jun 1941)
Grumman Martlet Mk I (Oct 1941)
Brewster Buffalo Mk I (Dec 1941 - Apr 1942)
Hawker Hurricane Mk I (Oct 1941 - Dec 1942)
Hawker Sea Hurricane Mk IB (Oct 1941 - Dec 1942)
Hawker Sea Hurricane Mk IIC (May 1944 - Oct 1944)
North American Harvard IIA (Apr 1945 - Jan 1946)
Vought Corsair Mk III (Apr 1945 - Oct 1945)
Grumman Hellcat F. Mk I (Aug 1945)
Supermarine Seafire F Mk III (Oct 1945 - Jan 1946)

Naval Air Stations and Royal Navy Shore Establishment 

764 Naval Air Squadron operated from a number of naval air stations of the Royal Navy and a Royal Navy shore establishment:
Royal Naval Air Station EASTLEIGH (1 April 1940 - 16 September 1940)
Royal Naval Air Station YEOVILTON (16 September 1940 - 13 August 1941)
Royal Naval Air Station INSKIP (1 May 1944 - 1 November 1944)
Royal Naval Air Station ZEALS (10 April 1945 - 12 September 1945)
Royal Naval Air Station LEE-ON-SOLENT (12 September 1945 - 27 December 1945)
Royal Naval Air Station HENSTRIDGE (27 December 1945 - 23 January 1946)
Royal Naval Air Station LEE-ON-SOLENT (1989 - 1995)
HMS Sultan (1995–present)

Commanding Officers 

List of commanding officers of 760 Naval Air Squadron with month and year of appointment and end:

1940 - 1942
Lt J. Chasson, RN (Apr 1940-May 1940)
Lt-Cdr P. H. Havers, RN (May 1940-Jan 1941)
Lt-Cdr G. N. Torry, RN (Jan 1941-Aug 1941)
Lt K. V. V. Spurway, RN (Aug 1941-Oct 1941)
Lt E. W. T. Taylour, RN (Oct 1941-Dec 1941)
Lt O. J. R. Nicolls, RN (Dec 1941-Aug 1941)

1944
Lt-Cdr J. D. Kellsal, RNVR (May 1944-Nov 1944)

1945 - 1946
Lt-Cdr P. G. Burke, RNZVNR (Apr 1945-Sep 1945)
Lt-Cdr R. Tebble, RNVR (Sep 1945-Jan 1946)

References

Citations

Bibliography

700 series Fleet Air Arm squadrons
Military units and formations established in 1940
Military units and formations of the Royal Navy in World War II